The Dead Stream Flooding State Wildlife Management Area is a protected wildlife area located in the U.S. state of Michigan. It is controlled and maintained by the Michigan Department of Natural Resources.  

The wildlife management area owes its creation to the Reedsburg Dam, which was constructed in 1940 along the Muskegon River to alleviate flooding from Houghton Lake.

Location
The area's headquarters are located at the Houghton Lake DNR Wildlife Office at 8717 North Roscommon Road (M-18) in the nearby village of Roscommon. The wildlife management area itself is mostly accessible from U.S. Route 127 exit 194 (M-55) and County Road 300, and the overall area is sparsely populated.

The unconnected Houghton Lake Flats Flooding State Wildlife Management Area is just to the east, and a number of other protected areas are within close proximity, including North Higgins Lake State Park, South Higgins Lake State Park, Hartwick Pines State Park, Houghton Lake State Wildlife Research Area, Bear Creek Flooding State Wildlife Management Area, Backus Creek State Game Area, and Denton Creek Flooding State Wildlife Management Area.

The forests surrounding the Dead Stream Flooding State Wildlife Management Area are also protected as state forest land managed by the Michigan Department of Natural Resources in the Au Sable State Forest and Pere Marquette State Forest.

Activities
The area is popular among campers, tourists, fishermen, and hunters.  Common fish within the waters include pumpkinseed, bluegill, small and largemouth bass, native crayfish, northern pike, yellow perch, and bowfin.  There are ample shore fishing locations and two public boating access points.  The Dead Stream Flooding is mostly shallow and contains numerous underwater obstacles that make larger motorized vessels discouraged.  The surrounding woodlands are open to seasonal waterfowl, turkey, and deer hunting.  Other popular activities include bird watching, geocaching, photography, and canoeing/kayaking.  Rustic camping is available at the Reedsburg Dam State Forest Campground on the northeast side of the dam.  The campground is operated by the nearby North Higgins Lake State Park.

Recent history

Beginning in August 2018, the Reedsburg Dam is undergoing major reconstruction lasting for at least one year, and the Dead Stream Flooding will be completely drained to allow for only the original flow of the Muskegon River.  The construction is necessary to repair and rebuild the nearly 80-year-old earthen dike and concrete and steel structures of the dam.  During the project, portions of the wetlands of the Dead Stream Flooding State Wildlife Management Area will be temporarily dried up; most of the lower water levels will take place around the Reedsburg Dam reservoir and not further upstream along the Muskegon River.  When the construction project is complete, the reservoir was expected to slowly return to original levels by summer 2020.  

However, due to the COVID-19 pandemic in Michigan, the Reedsburg Dam reconstruction was delayed.  While more than 90% of the dam project has been completed prior to the delay, the water levels was originally expected to return to normal levels by fall 2020.  The construction project itself was completely by September 2020, and water levels will be raised slowly to their original level.

References

Protected areas of Roscommon County, Michigan
Tourist attractions in Roscommon County, Michigan
Protected areas of Missaukee County, Michigan
Tourist attractions in Missaukee County, Michigan
Wildlife management areas of Michigan
Wetlands of Michigan